Melitaea punica is a butterfly of the family Nymphalidae. It is found in North Africa.

Adults are on wing from June to July.

References

Butterflies described in 1876
Melitaea
Butterflies of Africa
Taxa named by Charles Oberthür